Matt Foley is a fictional character from the sketch comedy program Saturday Night Live performed by Chris Farley. Foley is a motivational speaker who exhibits characteristics atypical of someone in that position: whereas motivational speakers are usually successful and charismatic, Foley is abrasive, clumsy, and down on his luck. The character was popular in its original run and went on to become one of Farley's best-known characters.

History 
The character's concept was first created by Bob Odenkirk. Farley debuted the character during his tenure in The Second City comedy troupe prior to his joining the cast of Saturday Night Live. Farley named the character after one of his Marquette University rugby union teammates, who was an Army Chaplain and is now a Roman Catholic priest in the Chicago suburb of Arlington Heights. Reviewing the stage version of the sketch in 1990, the Chicago Reader wrote:

...even if he is imitating the loudmouth imbecile Sam Kinison to the decibel, Chris Farley is a stitch in "Motivation." He plays a scuzzy drug abuser hired by parents to scare their kids straight, a case of negative psychology taken over a cliff.

Matt Foley appeared in eight Saturday Night Live sketches. Each sketch typically started with Foley brought into a specific situation by someone to speak to a group. The sketches usually feature Farley's physical comedy, such as the over-caffeinated Foley gesticulating wildly and leaping around, often breaking furniture. At the end of each sketch, he is usually rushed out of his speaking location, where the people left behind huddle together and comment on him, usually bemused and frightened. Though his intended message is always ruined by his bizarre presentation, his results are usually successful as his audience changes their behavior so as to avoid further association with Foley.

The character's debut was so popular that Farley turned it into one of his best-known routines and one which he would repeat many times, both as Foley and as other characters on SNL and in film during the remainder of his life and career, sometimes injuring himself in the process.

Being a Wisconsin native, Farley was asked to portray the Matt Foley character at the 1994 Rose Bowl banquet. He delivered a comedic "motivational speech" to the Wisconsin Badgers football team, who were to face the UCLA Bruins that year and won the game, 21–16.

Plans for a film version with David Spade in a supporting role were shelved after Farley's death in 1997.

Personality and appearance
Foley is disheveled, sweaty, obese, clumsy and unstylish. He exhibits poor social skills, frequently loses his temper, often disparages and insults his audience, and wallows in cynicism and self-pity about his own poor life choices, to which he often makes reference. Foley's trademark line is warning his audience that they could end up like himself: "35 years old, eating a steady diet of government cheese, thrice divorced, and living in a van down by the river!" In most sketches, whenever a member of his audience mentions a personal accomplishment, Foley responds with mockery: "Well, la-dee-frickin-da!", "Whoop-dee-frickin-doo!", or a similarly dismissive remark. The usual outfit of choice for Foley is a too-small blue-and-white plaid sport coat, a too-big white dress shirt, a solid green necktie, black horn-rimmed glasses, ill-fitting khakis which he is continually pulling up, a wristwatch, penny loafers, and slicked-down blond hair. In a prison sketch, he dons blue jeans and a denim shirt with the inmate number "3307" while retaining his watch, glasses and a crucifix necklace (he also mentions a "homemade tattoo of a van down by the river"). While working as a mall Santa in another sketch, he wears a stereotypical Santa outfit, complete with black snow boots.

He overindulges in coffee and caffeine-based products and exhibits extreme hyperactivity as a result. In almost every appearance, Foley mentions drinking espresso or coffee, or taking NoDoz and even brings a duffel bag with a pot of coffee to the gym to teach a spinning class. His clients will often mention him either drinking coffee or eating coffee beans before calling him in to begin his presentation.

Despite his otherwise bad attitude, Foley has a passion for his career as a motivational speaker, going as far as to travel to Venezuela to speak to teens. While serving a term in prison, Foley seems to be respected, and to have a good friendship with his cellmate Deshawn Powers, who refers to Foley as "The straight-up OG...of cell block three!".

Notable appearances 

The character's debut performance (May 8, 1993) has been called one of the best segments in SNL history. The reception of the audience combined with visible stifled laughter from David Spade and Christina Applegate on stage added to the popularity of the sketch. Notable physical gestures from Farley included what Spade referred to as "the thing with the glasses" when Farley lifted his glasses on and off of his face commenting, "Hey Dad, I can’t see real good, is that Bill Shakespeare over there?" and perhaps the most defining gesture was one that Farley saved for the live performance when he alternated hands adjusting his trousers, grabbing the hilt  of his belt with one hand and the back of his pants with the other. In the sketch itself, Foley attempts to motivate two teens, played by Spade and Applegate, to "get themselves back on the right track" after the family's cleaning lady finds a bag of marijuana in their home. Foley's attempt to motivate them falls short when he repeatedly insists that they're "not going to amount to jack squat" and will end up "living in a van down by the river!" Foley attempts to endear himself to Spade's character by telling him they're "gonna be buddies" and that everywhere he goes, Foley will follow. Comparing himself to Spade's shadow, Foley jumps about where he is standing and then dives into the coffee table, though he picks himself up moments later. None of the other cast members knew that Farley was going to do this and their startled reactions are genuine. The sketch ends with Foley offering that the only solution to solve the family's problems is for him to move in with them. Horrified, Applegate begs him not to, vowing never to smoke pot again. Even so, Foley leaves the house to get his “gear” from his van; Hartman leads him out the door and then, the moment Foley leaves, immediately slams it shut and locks him out in fear, the family then finally reconciling and admitting to how much they love each other.

A later performance (February 19, 1994) features Foley in prison attempting to motivate troubled teens in a scared straight program; he was imprisoned for three to five years for non-payment of alimony (consistent with him being "thrice divorced"). Before entering the sketch, Foley is introduced by his cellmate Deshawn Powers (Martin Lawrence) as "just finished a week in solitary, eating nothing but coffee beans." Foley attempts to scare the juvenile delinquents by commenting in a slightly different manner that he "wished to dear God, that he was living in a van down by the river!" The sketch followed the usual Foley routine with him falling through the prison wall instead of a coffee table, which eventually led to his and the other inmates' escape.

In a notable departure for the character, a sketch featured George Foreman contemplating that he was too old and weak to continue boxing. During a walk by the river, he stumbles upon Foley's van. Foley, rather than engaging in his usual tirades, orders Foreman to perform a series of tasks for him, such as grilling hamburgers, claiming the work is "for dexterity". When Foreman eventually determines Foley is taking advantage of him, he punches Foley, causing Foreman to realize he can still fight, and he goes on to win the world championship. Foreman then is shown reciting the story of these events to Tim Meadows, who wonders aloud why he is cooking hamburgers for Foreman, only to be told, "You know why! For dexterity!"

In the only cold open featuring Foley (April 15, 1995), the character attempts to motivate a pair of Venezuelan teens. Foley attempts to get through to them by motivating them in their native Spanish, saying "¡Yo vivo en van cerca de un rio!" However, the teenagers' father (Michael McKean) informs Matt that he and his children are fluent in English, to which Foley responds "¡Padre, dame un favor, y cállate su grande YAPPER!" The sketch again features Foley mocking his audience, breaking household objects, and, somehow, succeeding in his motivational goals.

Farley also appeared as Matt Foley on Late Night with Conan O'Brien on January 14, 1994.

In a 1997 guest appearance on All That, Farley appeared as Chef Farley opposite future SNL cast member Kenan Thompson in a "Cooking with Randy" sketch. He used many of Foley's mannerisms.

Parodies
In the 3rd episode of season 20 of Family Guy, Peter Griffin dresses up as the character for Halloween, and refers to Farley's death as "the least surprising death in Hollywood history".

List of SNL episodes featured 
 May 8, 1993 (host Christina Applegate)
 October 30, 1993 (host Christian Slater)
 December 11, 1993 (host Sally Field)
 February 19, 1994 (host Martin Lawrence)
 May 14, 1994 (host Heather Locklear)
 December 17, 1994 (host George Foreman)
 April 15, 1995 (host Courteney Cox)
 October 25, 1997 (host Chris Farley)
 February 15, 2015 (40th Anniversary Special, played by Melissa McCarthy)

See also 
 Recurring Saturday Night Live characters and sketches
 Chris Farley's character inspiration: The Real Matt Foley

References

External links 

SNL Transcripts – contains scripts from most "Matt Foley, Motivational Speaker" sketches in searchable database
Cold Opening: Matt Foley | Saturday Night Live - Yahoo Screen
Down By The River | Saturday Night Live - Yahoo Screen
Matt Foley in Prison | Saturday Night Live - Yahoo Screen
 SNL Transcripts: Christina Applegate: 05/08/93: Matt Foley: Motivational Speaker
 Matt Foley, Bilingual Motivational Speaker

Saturday Night Live sketches
Saturday Night Live in the 1990s
Saturday Night Live characters
Fictional prison escapees
Television characters introduced in 1993